Greg Schwager is a retired American soccer defender who played professionally in the United States, Germany and Denmark.

Schwager attended San Jose State University where he played on the men’s soccer team in 1991. In 1992, he turned professional with the Palo Alto Firebirds of the USISL. That season, the Firebirds won the league championship and Schwager was named All League.  In 1994, Schwager moved to Germany and signed with TuS Hoisdorf. He moved to TuS Celle FC a year later. In 1996, he moved up to VfL Osnabrück. He began the 1997-1998 season with VfL Osnabrück, but transferred to Vejle Boldklub of the Danish Superliga during the mid-season transfer window. He saw limited time with Vejle and was back in Germany with Osnabrück for the second half of the 1998-1999 season.

References

Living people
1969 births
American soccer players
American expatriate soccer players
Palo Alto Firebirds players
San Jose State Spartans men's soccer players
TuS Celle FC players
TuS Hoisdorf players
USISL players
Vejle Boldklub players
VfL Osnabrück players
Association football defenders